The Greek Civil War (o Emfýlios [Pólemos], "the Civil War") took place from 1946 to 1949. The conflict, which erupted shortly after the end of World War II, consisted of a Communist-dominated uprising against the established government of the Kingdom of Greece. The opposition declared a people's republic, the Provisional Democratic Government of Greece, which was governed by the Communist Party of Greece (KKE) and its military branch, the Democratic Army of Greece (DSE). The rebels were supported by Yugoslavia and the Soviet Union. With the support of the United Kingdom and United States, the Greek government forces ultimately prevailed.

The war had its roots in divisions within Greece during World War II between the communist-dominated left-wing resistance organisation, the EAM-ELAS, and loosely-allied anticommunist resistance forces. It later escalated into a major civil war between the Greek state and the communists. Fighting resulted in the defeat of the DSE by the Hellenic Army.

The war resulted from a highly-polarised struggle between left and right ideologies that started when each side targeted the power vacuum resulting from the end of Axis occupation (1941–1944) during World War II. The struggle was the first proxy war of the Cold War and represents the first example of postwar involvement on the part of the Allies in the internal affairs of a foreign country, an implementation of George F. Kennan's containment policy in his Long Telegram. Greece in the end was funded by the United States (through the Truman Doctrine and the Marshall Plan) and joined NATO (1952), while the insurgents were demoralized by the bitter split between the Soviet Union's Joseph Stalin, who wanted to end the war, and Yugoslavia's Josip Broz Tito, who wanted it to continue.

Background: 1941–1944

Origins

While Axis forces approached Athens in April 1941, King George II and his government escaped to Egypt, where they proclaimed a government-in-exile, recognised by the UK but not by the Soviet Union. British Prime Minister Winston Churchill encouraged George II to appoint a moderate cabinet. As a result, only two of his ministers were previous members of the 4th of August Regime under Ioannis Metaxas, who had both seized power in a coup d'état with the blessing of the king and governed the country since August 1936. Nevertheless, the exiled government's inability to influence affairs inside Greece rendered it irrelevant in the minds of most Greek people. At the same time, the Germans set up a collaborationist government in Athens, which lacked legitimacy and support. The puppet regime was further undermined when economic mismanagement in wartime conditions created runaway inflation, acute food shortages and famine among the civilian population.

The power vacuum that the occupation created was filled by several resistance movements that ranged from royalist to communist ideologies. Resistance was born first in eastern Macedonia and Thrace, where Bulgarian troops occupied Greek territory. Soon large demonstrations were organized in many cities by the Defenders of Northern Greece (YVE), a patriotic organization. However, the largest group to emerge was the National Liberation Front (EAM), founded on 27 September 1941 by representatives of four left-wing parties. Proclaiming that it followed the Soviet policy of creating a broad united front against fascism, EAM won the support of many non-communist patriots.

These resistance groups launched attacks against the occupying powers and set up large espionage networks. The communist leaders of EAM, however, had planned to dominate in postwar Greece, so, usually by force, they tried to take over or destroy the other Greek resistance groups (such as the destruction of National and Social Liberation (EKKA) and the murder of its leader, Dimitrios Psarros by Greek People's Liberation Army (ELAS) partisans) and undertaking a campaign of Red Terror. When liberation came in October 1944, Greece was in a state of crisis, which soon led to the outbreak of civil war.

Although controlled by the Communist Party of Greece (KKE), the organization had democratic republican rhetoric. Its military wing, ELAS was founded in February 1942. Aris Velouchiotis, a member of KKE's Central Committee, was nominated Chief (Kapetanios) of the ELAS High Command. The military chief, Stefanos Sarafis, was a colonel in the prewar Greek army who had been dismissed during the Metaxas regime for his views. The political chief of EAM was Vasilis Samariniotis (nom de guerre of Andreas Tzimas).

The Organization for the Protection of the People's Struggle (OPLA) was founded as EAM's security militia, operating mainly in the occupied cities and most particularly Athens. A small Greek People's Liberation Navy (ELAN) was created, operating mostly around the Ionian Islands and some other coastal areas. Other Communist-aligned organizations were present, including the National Liberation Front (NOF), composed mostly of Slavic Macedonians in the Florina region. They would later play a critical role in the civil war. The two other large resistance movements were the National Republican Greek League (EDES), led by republican former army officer Colonel Napoleon Zervas, and the social-liberal EKKA, led by Colonel Dimitrios Psarros.

Guerrilla control over rural areas

The Greek landscape was favourable to guerrilla operations, and by 1943, the Axis forces and their collaborators were in control only of the main towns and connecting roads, leaving the mountainous countryside to the resistance. EAM-ELAS in particular controlled most of the country's mountainous interior, while EDES was limited to Epirus and EKKA to eastern Central Greece. By early 1944 ELAS could call on nearly 25,000 men under arms, with another 80,000 working as reserves or logistical support, EDES had roughly 10,000 men, and EKKA had under 10,000 men.

To combat the rising influence of the EAM, and fearful of an eventual takeover after the German defeat, in 1943, Ioannis Rallis, the Prime Minister of the collaborationist government, authorised the creation of paramilitary forces, known as the Security Battalions. Numbering 20,000 at their peak in 1944, composed mostly of local fascists, convicts, sympathetic prisoners-of-war and forcibly impressed conscripts, they operated under German command in Nazi security warfare operations and soon achieved a reputation for brutality.

EAM-ELAS, EDES and EKKA were mutually suspicious and tensions were exacerbated as the end of the war became nearer and the question of the country's political future arose. The role of the British military mission in these events proved decisive. EAM was by far the largest and most active group but was determined to achieve its own political goal to dominate postwar Greece, and its actions were not always directed against the Axis powers. Consequently, British material support was directed mostly to the more reliable Zervas, who by 1943 had reversed his earlier anti-monarchist stance.

First conflicts: 1943–1944

The Western Allies, at first, provided all resistance organisations with funds and equipment. However, they gave special preference to ELAS, which they saw as the most reliable partner and a formidable fighting force that would be able to create more problems for the Axis than other resistance movements. As the end of the war approached, the British Foreign Office, fearing a possible Communist upsurge, observed with displeasure the transformation of ELAS into a large-scale conventional army more and more out of Allied control. After the September 8, 1943, Armistice with Italy, ELAS seized control of Italian garrison weapons in the country. In response, the Western Allies began to favor rival anti-Communist resistance groups. They provided them with ammunition, supplies and logistical support as a way of balancing ELAS's increasing influence. In time, the flow of weapons and funds to ELAS stopped altogether, and rival EDES received the bulk of the Allied support.

In mid-1943 the animosity between ELAS and the other movements erupted into armed conflict. The communists and EAM accused EDES of being traitors and collaborators, and vice versa. Other smaller groups, such as EKKA, continued the anti-occupation fight with sabotage and other actions. They declined to join the ranks of ELAS. While some organizations accepted assistance from the Nazis in their operations against ELAS, the great majority of the population refused any form of cooperation with the occupation authorities. By early 1944, after a British-negotiated ceasefire (the Plaka Agreement), ELAS had destroyed EKKA and confined EDES to a small part of Epirus, where it could only play a marginal role in the rest of the war. Its political network (EAM) had reached about 500,000 citizens around the country. By 1944, ELAS had the numerical advantage in armed fighters, having more than 50,000 men in arms and an extra 500,000 working as reserves or logistical support personnel (Efedrikos ELAS). In contrast, EDES and EKKA had around 10,000 fighters each

After the declaration of the formation of the Security Battalions, KKE and EAM implemented a pre-emptive policy of terror, mainly in the Peloponnese countryside areas close to garrisoned German units, to ensure civilian allegiance. As the communist position strengthened, so did the numbers of the "Security Battalions", with both sides engaged in skirmishes. The ELAS units were accused of what became known as the Meligalas massacre. Meligalas was the headquarters of a local Security Battalion Unit that was given control of the wider area of Messenia by the Nazis. After a battle there between ELAS and the Security Battalions, ELAS forces prevailed, and the remaining forces of the collaborators were taken into custody.

After the civil war ended, postwar governments declared that 1000 members of the collaborationist units were massacred along with civilians by the Communists; however, that number was not matched by the actual numbers of bodies found in the mass grave (an old well in the area) of executed Security Battalion and civilian prisoners. According to left-wing sources, civilian bodies found there could have been victims of the Security Battalions. As Security Battalions were replacing occupation forces in territories the Germans could not enter, they were accused of many instances of brutality against civilians and captured partisans, and of the executions of prominent EAM and KKE members by hanging.

In addition, recruiting by both sides was controversial, as the case of Stefanos Sarafis indicates. The soon-to-be military leader of ELAS sought to join the noncommunist resistance group commanded by Kostopoulos in Thessaly, along with other former officers. On their way, they were captured by an ELAS group, with Sarafis agreeing to join ELAS at gunpoint when all other officers who refused were killed. Sarafis never admitted this incident, and in his book on ELAS makes special reference to the letter that he sent all officers of the former Greek army to join the ranks of EAM-ELAS. Again, numbers favored the EAM organisation; nearly 800 officers of the pre-war Greek army joined the ranks of ELAS with the position of military leader and Kapetanios.

Egypt "mutiny" and the Lebanon Conference

In March 1944, EAM established the Political Committee of National Liberation (Politiki Epitropi Ethnikis Apeleftherosis, or PEEA), in effect a third Greek government to rival those in Athens and Cairo "to intensify the struggle against the conquerors... for full national liberation, for the consolidation of the independence and integrity of our country... and for the annihilation of domestic Fascism and armed traitor formations." PEEA was dominated by, but not composed exclusively of Communists.

The moderate aims of the PEEA (known as "κυβέρνηση του βουνού", "the Mountain Government") aroused support even among Greeks in exile. In April 1944 the Egypt based Free Greek Forces, many of them well-disposed towards EAM, demanded for a government of national unity to be established, based on PEEA principles, to replace the government-in-exile, as it had no political or other link with the occupied home country and that any pro-fascist elements in the Army be removed.

The movement threatened Allied unity, angering Great Britain and the United States. British and Greek troops loyal to the exiled government moved to suppress the PEEA. Approximately 5,000 Greek soldiers and officers were disarmed and deported to prison camps. After the mutiny, Allied economic aid to the EAM almost stopped. Later on, through political screening of the officers, the Cairo government created the III Greek Mountain Brigade, composed of staunchly anti-communist personnel, under the command of Brigadier Thrasyvoulos Tsakalotos.

In May 1944, representatives from all political parties and resistance groups came together at the Lebanon Conference under the leadership of Georgios Papandreou, in hopes of forming a government of national unity. Despite EAM's accusations of collaboration made against all other Greek resistance forces and charges against EAM-ELAS members of murders, banditry and thievery, the conference ended with an agreement (the National Contract) for a government of national unity consisting of 24 ministers (6 to be EAM members). The agreement was made possible by Soviet directives to KKE to avoid harming Allied unity, but did not resolve the problem of disarmament of resistance groups.

Confrontation: 1944
By 1944, EDES and ELAS each saw the other to be their great enemy. They both saw that the Germans were going to be defeated and were a temporary threat. For the ELAS, the British represented their major problem, even while for the majority of Greeks, the British were their major hope for an end to the war.

From the Lebanon Conference to the outbreak
By the summer of 1944, it was obvious that the Germans would soon withdraw from Greece, as Soviet forces were advancing into Romania and towards Yugoslavia, threatening to cut off the retreating Germans. In September, General Fyodor Tolbukhin's armies advanced into Bulgaria, forcing the resignation of the country's pro-Nazi government and the establishment of a pro-communist regime, while Bulgarian troops withdrew from Greek Macedonia. The government-in-exile, now led by prominent liberal Georgios Papandreou, moved to Italy, in preparation for its return to Greece. Under the Caserta Agreement of September 1944, all resistance forces in Greece were placed under the command of a British officer, General Ronald Scobie. The Western Allies arrived in Greece in October, by which time the Germans were in full retreat and most of Greece's territory had already been liberated by Greek partisans. On October 13, British troops entered Athens, the only area still occupied by the Germans, and Papandreou and his ministers followed six days later. The king stayed in Cairo because Papandreou had promised that the future of the monarchy would be decided by referendum.

There was little to prevent ELAS from taking full control of the country. With the German withdrawal, ELAS units had taken control of the countryside and most cities. However, they did not take full control because the KKE leadership was instructed by the Soviet Union not to precipitate a crisis that could jeopardize Allied unity and put Joseph Stalin's larger postwar objectives at risk. The KKE's leadership knew so, but the ELAS's fighters and rank-and-file Communists did not, which became a source of conflict within both EAM and ELAS. Following Stalin's instructions, the KKE's leadership tried to avoid a confrontation with the Papandreou government. The majority of the ELAS members saw the Western Allies as liberators, although some KKE leaders, such as Andreas Tzimas and Aris Velouchiotis, did not trust them. Tzimas was in touch with Yugoslav communist leader Josip Broz Tito and disagreed with ELAS's cooperation with the Western Allied forces.

The issue of disarming the resistance organizations was a cause of friction between the Papandreou government and its EAM members. Advised by British ambassador Reginald Leeper, Papandreou demanded the disarmament of all armed forces apart from the Sacred Band and the III Mountain Brigade and the constitution of a National Guard under government control. The communists, believing that it would leave the ELAS defenseless against its opponents, submitted an alternative plan of total and simultaneous disarmament, but Papandreou rejected it, causing EAM ministers to resign from the government on December 2. On December 1, Scobie issued a proclamation calling for the dissolution of ELAS. Command of ELAS was KKE's greatest source of strength, and KKE leader Siantos decided that the demand for ELAS's dissolution must be resisted.

Tito's influence may have played some role in ELAS's resistance to disarmament. Tito was outwardly loyal to Stalin, but had come to power through his own means and believed that communist Greeks should do the same. His influence, however, had not prevented the EAM leadership from putting its forces under Scobie's command a couple of months earlier in accordance with the Caserta Agreement. In the meantime, following Georgios Grivas's instructions, Organization X members had set up outposts in central Athens and resisted EAM for several days, until British troops arrived, as their leader had been promised.

The Dekemvriana events

According to the Caserta Agreement all Greek forces (tactical and guerillas) were under Allied command. On December 1, 1944, the Greek government of "National Unity" under Papandreou and Scobie announced an ultimatum for the general disarmament of all guerrilla forces by 10 December excluding the tactical forces (the III Greek Mountain Brigade and the Sacred Band); and also a part of EDES and ELAS that would be used, if it was necessary, in Allied operations in Crete and Dodecanese against the remaining German army. As a result, on December 2 six ministers of the EAM, most of whom were KKE members, resigned from their positions in the "National Unity" government. The EAM called for a general strike and announced the reorganization of the Central Committee of ELAS. A demonstration, forbidden by the government, was organised by EAM on December 3.

The demonstration involved at least 200,000 people marching in Athens on Panepistimiou Street towards the Syntagma Square. British tanks along with police units had been scattered around the area, blocking the way of the demonstrators. Shooting began when the marchers had arrived at the Tomb of the Unknown Soldier, above the Syntagma Square. They originated from the building of the General Police Headquarters, from the Parliament (Βουλή), from the Hotel Grande Bretagne (where international observers had settled), from other governmental buildings and from policemen on the street.

Among many testimonies, N. Farmakis, a member of the Organization X participating in the shootings, described that he heard the head of the police Angelos Evert giving the order to open fire on the crowd. Although there are no accounts hinting that the crowd indeed possessed guns, the British commander Christopher Montague Woodhouse insisted that it was uncertain whether the first shots were fired by the police or the demonstrators. A total of 28 protesters were killed by the Greek police that day, and hundreds were injured. This signaled the beginning of the Dekemvriana ("the December events"), a 37-day period of full-scale fighting in Athens between EAM fighters and smaller parts of ELAS and the forces of the British army and the government.

At the beginning the government had only a few policemen and gendarmes, some militia units, the III Greek Mountain Brigade, which, however, lacked heavy weapons, and the royalist group Organization X, which was accused by EAM of collaborating with the Nazis. Consequently, the British intervened in support of the government, freely using artillery and aircraft as the battle approached its last stages.

In the early morning hours of 4 December, ELAS reservists began operations in the Athens–Piraeus area, attacking Grivas' X forces. In the evening, a peaceful demonstration by EAM members cum funeral procession took place. Government forces took no action but the procession was attacked by X forces led by Colonel Grivas, with over 100 dead.

On December 4, Papandreou gave his resignation to Scobie, who rejected it. By December 12, ΕΑΜ was in control of most of Athens and Piraeus. The British, outnumbered, flew in the 4th Indian Infantry Division from Italy as emergency reinforcements. Although the British were openly fighting against the EAM in Athens, there were no such battles in the rest of Greece. In certain cases, such as Volos, some RAF units even surrendered equipment to ELAS fighters. However, the units of the ELAS in Central Greece and Epirus attacked Napoleon Zervas's units of the EDES forcing them to flee to the Ionian islands.

Conflicts continued throughout December with the forces confronting the EAM slowly gaining the upper hand. ELAS forces in the rest of Greece did not attack the British. It seems that the ELAS preferred to avoid an armed confrontation with the British forces initially and later tried to reduce the conflict as much as possible although poor communication between its very independent units around the country might also have played a role. That might explain the simultaneous struggle against the British, the largescale ELAS operations against Trotskyists and other political dissidents in Athens and the many contradictory decisions of EAM leaders. Also, KKE's leadership, was supporting a doctrine of "national unity" while eminent members, such as Leonidas Stringos, Theodoros Makridis and even Georgios Siantos were creating revolutionary plans. Even more curiously, Tito was both the KKE's key sponsor and a key British ally, owing his physical and political survival in 1944 to British assistance.

Churchill in Athens
This outbreak of fighting between Allied forces and an anti-German European resistance movement while the war in Europe was still being fought was a serious political problem for Churchill's coalition government of left and right. It caused much protest in the British press and the House of Commons. To prove his peacemaking intentions to the public, Churchill went to Athens on December 25 to preside over a conference in the Hotel Grande Bretagne in which Soviet representatives also participated, to bring about a settlement. It failed because the EAM/ELAS demands were considered excessive and so rejected. Later, it became known that there was a plan by EAM to blow up the building, aiming to kill the participants, and the conference was finally cancelled.

Meanwhile, the Soviet Union remained passive about developments in Greece. True to their "percentages agreement" with Britain relating to Greece, the Soviet delegation in Greece neither encouraged nor discouraged EAM's ambitions, as Greece belonged to the British sphere of influence. The delegation's chief gained the nickname "sphinx" among local Communist officers for not giving any clues about Soviet intentions. Pravda did not mention the clashes at all.

By early January, EAM forces had lost the battle. Despite Churchill's intervention, Papandreou resigned and was replaced by General Nikolaos Plastiras. On January 15, 1945, Scobie agreed to a ceasefire in exchange for ELAS's withdrawal from its positions at Patras and Thessaloniki and its demobilisation in the Peloponnese. Despite the severe defeat, ELAS continued to exist, and the KKE had an opportunity to reconsider its strategy.

KKE's defeat in 1945 was mainly political but the exaltation of terrorism in the whole country made a political settlement even more difficult. The hunting of "collaborators" was extended to people who were supporting the Greek government. The brutal treatment by the OPLA and other minor communist groups of supposed collaborators (including policemen, professors and priests) during the events greatly increased anticommunist sentiment. In the area of ULEN refineries, hundreds of supposed collaborators were executed. In the village of Feneos, OPLA turned a nearby monastery into a concentration camp and killing ground for those they deemed "reactionaries". It is believed that hundreds were killed. In addition, several Trotskyists had to leave the country in fear for their lives (Cornelius Castoriadis fled to France). As a result of the fighting in Athens, most of the prominent noncommunists of EAM left the organization, and KKE support declined sharply. After the ceasefire, ELAS under the leadership of Siantos left Athens, taking thousands of captives.

Interlude: 1945–1946

In February 1945, the various Greek parties signed the Treaty of Varkiza, with the support of all the Allies. It provided for the complete demobilisation of the ELAS and all other paramilitary groups, amnesty for only political offenses, a referendum on the monarchy and a general election to be held as soon as possible. The KKE remained legal and its leader, Nikolaos Zachariadis, who returned from Germany in April 1945, said that the KKE's objective was now for a "people's democracy" to be achieved by peaceful means. There were dissenters such as former ELAS leader Aris Velouchiotis. The KKE disavowed Velouchiotis when he called on the veteran guerrillas to start a second struggle; shortly afterwards, he committed suicide surrounded by security forces, but some think that the Soviet NKVD killed him.

The Treaty of Varkiza transformed the KKE's political defeat into a military one. The ELAS's existence was terminated. The amnesty was not comprehensive because many actions during the German occupation and the Dekemvriana were classified as criminal, exempting the perpetrators from the amnesty. Thus, the authorities captured approximately 40,000 Communists or ex-ELAS members. As a result, a number of veteran partisans hid their weapons in the mountains, and 5,000 of them escaped to Yugoslavia although that was not encouraged by the KKE's leadership.

Between 1945 and 1946, anticommunist forces allegedly killed about 1,190 communist civilians and tortured many others. Entire villages that had helped the partisans were attacked. The anticommunist forces are claimed to have admitted that they were "retaliating" for their suffering under ELAS rule. The reign of "White Terror" led many ex-ELAS members to form self-defence troops without any KKE approval.

The KKE soon reversed its former political position, as relations between the Soviet Union and the Western Allies deteriorated. With the onset of the Cold War, communist parties everywhere moved to more militant positions. The change of political attitude and the choice to escalate the crisis derived primarily from the conclusion that regime subversion, which had not been successful in December 1944, could now be achieved. The KKE leadership decided in February 1946, "after weighing domestic factors, and the Balkan and international situation", to go forward with "organization of a new armed struggle against the Monarcho-Fascist regime". The KKE boycotted the March 1946 elections, which were won by the monarchist United Alignment of Nationalists (Inomeni Parataxis Ethnikofronon), the main member of which was Konstantinos Tsaldaris's People's Party. A referendum in September 1946 favored the retention of the monarchy, but the KKE claimed that it had been rigged. King George returned to Athens.

The king's return to Greece reinforced British influence in the country. Nigel Clive, then a liaison officer to the Greek Government and later the head of the Athens station of MI6, stated, "Greece was a kind of British protectorate, but the British ambassador was not a colonial governor". There were to be six changes of prime ministers within just two years, an indication of the instability that would characterise the country's political life.

Civil War: 1946–1949

Crest: 1946–1948

Fighting resumed in March 1946, as a group of 30 ex-ELAS members attacked a police station in the village of Litochoro, killing the policemen, the night before the elections. The next day, the Rizospastis, the KKE's official newspaper, announced, "Authorities and gangs fabricate alleged communist attacks". Armed bands of ELAS' veterans were then infiltrating Greece through mountainous regions near the Yugoslav and Albanian borders; they were now organized as the Democratic Army of Greece (Dimokratikos Stratos Elladas, DSE) under the command of ELAS veteran Markos Vafiadis (known as "General Markos"), operating from a base in Yugoslavia and sent by the KKE to organize already existing troops.

The Yugoslav and Albanian communist governments supported the DSE fighters, but the Soviet Union remained ambivalent. The KKE kept an open line of communication with the Soviet Communist Party, and its leader, Nikos Zachariadis, had visited Moscow on more than one occasion. No evidence exists of mercenaries, although the guerrillas received various types of assistance from their Balkan communist neighbours. One example of an international volunteer joining the ranks of the DSE is Turkish communist Mihri Belli.

By late 1946, the DSE was able to deploy about 16,000 partisans, including 5,000 in the Peloponnese and other areas of Greece. According to the DSE, its fighters "resisted the reign of terror that right-wing gangs conducted across Greece". In the Peloponnese especially, local party officials, headed by Vangelis Rogakos, had established a plan long before the decision to go to guerrilla war under which the numbers of partisans operating in the mainland would be inversely proportional to the number of soldiers that the enemy would concentrate in the region. According to the study, the DSE III Division in the Peloponnese numbered between 1,000 and 5,000 fighters in early 1948.

Rural peasants were caught in the crossfire. When DSE partisans entered a village asking for supplies, citizens were supportive (in previous years, EAM could count on two million members across the whole country) or did not resist. When government troops arrived at the same village, citizens who had supplied the partisans were immediately denounced as communist sympathizers and usually imprisoned or exiled. In rural areas, the government also used a strategy, which had been advised by US advisers, of evacuating villages under the pretext that they were under direct threat of communist attack. That would deprive the partisans of supplies and recruits and simultaneously raise antipathy towards them.

The Greek Army now numbered about 90,000 men and was gradually being put on a more professional footing. The task of re-equipping and training the army had been carried out by its fellow Western Allies. By early 1947, however, Britain, which had spent £85 million in Greece since 1944, could no longer afford this burden. US President Harry S. Truman announced that the United States would step in to support the Greek government against Communist pressure. That began a long and troubled relationship between Greece and the United States. For several decades to come, the US ambassador advised the king on important issues, such as the appointment of the prime minister.

Through 1947, the scale of fighting increased. The DSE launched large-scale attacks on towns across northern Epirus, Thessaly, Peloponnese and Macedonia, provoking the army into massive counteroffensives, which met no opposition as the DSE melted back into the mountains and its safe havens across the northern borders. In the Peloponnese, where General Georgios Stanotas was appointed area commander, the DSE suffered heavily, with no way to escape to mainland Greece. In general, army morale was low, and it would be some time before US support became apparent.

Conventional warfare

In September 1947, however, the KKE's leadership decided to move from guerrilla tactics to fullscale conventional war despite the opposition of Vafiadis. In December, the KKE announced the formation of a Provisional Democratic Government, with Vafiadis as prime minister; that led the Athens government to ban the KKE. No foreign government recognized this government. The new strategy led the DSE into costly attempts to seize a major town as its seat of government, and in December 1947, 1200 DSE fighters were killed at a set battle around Konitsa. At the same time, the strategy forced the government to increase the size of the army. With control of the major cities, the government cracked down on KKE members and sympathizers, many of whom were imprisoned on the island of Makronisos.

Despite setbacks, such as the fighting at Konitsa, the DSE reached the height of its power in 1948, extending its operations to Attica, within 20 km of Athens. It drew on more than 20,000 fighters, both men and women, and a network of sympathizers and informants in every village and suburb.

Among analysts emphasising the KKE's perceived control and guidance by foreign powers, such as the Soviet Union and Yugoslavia, some estimate that of the DSE's 20,000 fighters, 14,000 were Slavic Macedonians from Greek Macedonia. Expanding their reasoning, they conclude that given their important role in the battle, the KKE changed its policy towards them. At the fifth Plenum of KKE on January 31, 1949, a resolution was passed declaring that after KKE's victory, the Slavic Macedonians would find their national restoration within a united Greek state. The alliance of the Democratic army with the Slavic Macedonians caused the official Greek state propaganda to call the communist guerillas Eamovulgari (from EAM plus Bulgarians), and the communists were calling their opponents Monarchofasistes (Monarch Fascists).

The extent of such involvement remains contentious and unclear; some emphasize that the KKE had in total 400,000 members (or 800,000, according to some sources) immediately prior to December 1944 and that during the Civil War, 100,000 ELAS fighters, mostly KKE members, were imprisoned, and 3,000 were executed. Supporters emphasise instead the DSE's conduct of a war effort across the country aimed at "a free and liberated Greece from all protectors that will have all the nationalities working under one Socialist State".

DSE divisions conducted guerrilla warfare across Greece; III Division, with 20,000 men in 1948, controlled 70% of the Peloponnese politically and militarily; battalions named after ELAS formations were active in northwestern Greece, and in the islands of Lesvos, Limnos, Ikaria, Samos, Creta, Evoia and the bulk of the Ionian Islands. Advisers, funds and equipment were now flooding into the country from Western Allies, and under their guidance a series of major offensives were launched into the mountains of central Greece. Although the offensives did not achieve all their objectives, they inflicted serious defeats on the DSE.

Communist removal of the children and the Queen's Camps

The removal of children by both sides was another highly emotive and contentious issue. About 30,000 children were forcefully taken by the DSE from territories they controlled to Eastern Bloc countries. Many others were moved for protection to special camps inside Greece, an idea of Queen Frederica. The issue drew the attention of international public opinion, and a United Nations Special Committee issued a report, stating that "some children have in fact been forcibly removed".

The communist leadership claimed that children were being gathered to be evacuated from Greece at the request of "popular organizations and parents". According to other researchers, the Greek government also followed a policy of displacement by adopting children of the guerrillas and placing them in indoctrination camps.

According to Kenneth Spencer, a UN committee reported at that time, "Queen Frederica has already prepared special 'reform camps' in Greek islands for 12,000 Greek children...." According to the official KKE story, the Provisional Government issued a directive for the evacuation of all minors from 4 to 14 years old for protection from the war and problems linked to it, as was stated clearly according to the decisions of the Provisional Government on March 7, 1948. According to non-KKE accounts, the children were abducted to be indoctrinated as Communist janissaries. Several United Nations General Assembly resolutions appealed for the repatriation of children to their homes. After 50 years, more information regarding the children gradually emerged. Many returned to Greece between 1975 and 1990, with varied views and attitudes toward the communist faction.

During the war, more than 25,000 children, most with parents in the DSE, were also placed in 30 "child towns" under the immediate control of Queen Frederika, something especially emphasised by the left. After 50 years, some of these children, given up for adoption to American families, were retracing their family background in Greece.

End of the war: 1949
The insurgents were demoralised by the bitter split between Stalin and Tito.  In June 1948, the Soviet Union and its satellites broke off relations with Tito. In one of the meetings held in the Kremlin with Yugoslav representatives, during the Soviet-Yugoslav crisis, Stalin stated his unqualified opposition to the "Greek uprising". Stalin explained to the Yugoslav delegation that the situation in Greece has always been different from the one in Yugoslavia because the US and Britain would "never permit [Greece] to break off their lines of communication in the Mediterranean". (Stalin used the word , Russian for "fold up", to express what the Greek Communists should do.)

Yugoslavia had been the Greek Communists' main supporter from the years of the occupation. The KKE thus had to choose between its loyalty to the Soviet Union and its relations with its closest ally. After some internal conflict, the great majority, led by party secretary Nikolaos Zachariadis, chose to follow the Soviet Union. In January 1949, Vafiadis himself was accused of "Titoism" and removed from his political and military positions, to be replaced by Zachariadis.

After a year of increasing acrimony, Tito closed the Yugoslav border to the DSE in July 1949, and disbanded its camps inside Yugoslavia. The DSE was still able to use Albanian border territories, a poor alternative. Within the KKE, the split with Tito also sparked a witch hunt for "Titoites" that demoralised and disorganised the ranks of the DSE and sapped support for the KKE in urban areas.

In summer 1948, DSE Division III in the Peloponnese suffered a huge defeat. Lacking ammunition support from DSE headquarters and having failed to capture government ammunition depots at Zacharo in the western Peloponnese, its 20,000 fighters were doomed. The majority (including the commander of the Division, Vangelis Rogakos) were killed in battle with nearly 80,000 National Army troops. The National Army's strategic plan, codenamed "Peristera" (the Greek word for "dove (bird)"), was successful. A number of other civilians were sent to prison camps for helping Communists. The Peloponnese was now governed by paramilitary groups fighting alongside the National Army. To terrify urban areas assisting DSE's III Division, the forces decapitated a number of dead fighters and placed them in central squares. Following defeat in southern Greece, the DSE continued to operate in northern Greece and some islands, but it was a greatly weakened force facing significant obstacles both politically and militarily.

At the same time, the National Army found a talented commander in General Alexander Papagos, commander of the Greek army during the Greco-Italian War. In August 1949, Papagos launched a major counteroffensive against DSE forces in northern Greece, codenamed "Operation Pyrsos/Torch". The campaign was a victory for the National Army and resulted in heavy losses for the DSE. The DSE army was now no longer able to sustain resistance in pitched battles. By September 1949, the main body of DSE divisions defending Grammos and Vitsi, the two key positions in northern Greece for the DSE, had retreated to Albania. Two main groups remained within the borders, trying to reconnect with scattered DSE fighters largely in Central Greece.

These groups, numbering 1,000 fighters, left Greece by the end of September 1949. The main body of the DSE, accompanied by its HQ, after discussion with the Communist Party of the Soviet Union and other Communist governments, was moved to Tashkent in the Soviet Union. They were to remain there, in military encampments, for three years. Other older combatants, alongside injured fighters, women and children, were relocated to European socialist states. On October 16, Zachariadis announced a "temporary ceasefire to prevent the complete annihilation of Greece"; the ceasefire marked the end of the Greek Civil War.

Almost 100,000 ELAS fighters and Communist sympathizers serving in DSE ranks were imprisoned, exiled, or executed. That deprived the DSE of the principal force still able to support its fight. According to some historians, the KKE's major supporter and supplier had always been Tito, and it was the rift between Tito and the KKE that marked the real demise of the party's efforts to assert power.

Western anti-Communist governments allied to Greece saw the end of the Greek Civil War as a victory in the Cold War against the Soviet Union. Communists countered that the Soviets never actively supported the Greek Communist efforts to seize power in Greece. Both sides had, at differing junctures, nevertheless looked to an external superpower for support.

Postwar division and reconciliation
The Civil War left Greece in ruins and in even greater economic distress than it had been following the end of German occupation. Additionally, it divided the Greek people for ensuing decades, with both sides vilifying their opponents. Thousands languished in prison for many years or were sent into internal exile on the islands of Gyaros and Makronisos. Many others sought refuge in communist countries or emigrated to Australia, Germany, the US, the UK, Canada and elsewhere.

The polarization and instability of Greek politics in the mid-1960s was a direct result of the Civil War and the deep divide between the leftist and rightist sections of Greek society. A major crisis as a result was the murder of the left-wing politician Gregoris Lambrakis in 1963, the inspiration for the Costa Gavras political thriller, Z. The crisis of the Apostasia followed in 1965, together with the "ASPIDA affair", which involved an alleged coup plot by a left-wing group of officers; the group's alleged leader was Andreas Papandreou, son of Georgios Papandreou, the leader of the Center Union political party and the country's prime minister at the time.

On April 21, 1967, a group of rightist and anti-communist army officers executed a coup d'état and seized power from the government, using the political instability and tension of the time as a pretext. The leader of the coup, Georgios Papadopoulos, was a member of the right-wing military organization IDEA ("Sacred Bond of Greek Officers"), and the subsequent military regime (later referred to as the Regime of the Colonels) lasted until 1974.

After the collapse of the military junta, a conservative government under Constantine Karamanlis led to the abolition of monarchy, the legalization of the KKE and a new constitution, which guaranteed political freedoms, individual rights and free elections. In 1981, in a major turning point in Greek history, the centre-left government of the Panhellenic Socialist Movement (PASOK) allowed a number of DSE veterans who had taken refuge in communist countries to return to Greece and reestablish their former estates, which greatly helped to diminish the consequences of the Civil War in Greek society. The PASOK administration also offered state pensions to former partisans of the anti-Nazi resistance; Markos Vafiadis was honorarily elected as member of the Greek parliament under PASOK's flag.

In 1989, the coalition government between Nea Dimokratia and the Coalition of Left and Progress (SYNASPISMOS), in which the KKE was for a period the major force, suggested a law that was passed unanimously by the Greek Parliament, formally recognizing the 1946–1949 war as a civil war and not merely as a communist insurgency (Συμμοριτοπόλεμος Symmoritopolemos) ( Ν. 1863/89 (ΦΕΚ 204Α΄) ). Under the terms of this law, the war of 1946–1949 was recognized as a Greek Civil War between the National Army and the Democratic Army of Greece, for the first time in Greek postwar history. Under the aforementioned law, the term "communist bandits" (Κομμουνιστοσυμμορίτες Kommounistosymmorites, ΚΣ), wherever it had occurred in Greek law, was replaced by the term "Fighters of the DSE".

In a 2008 Gallup poll, Greeks were asked "whether it was better that the right wing won the Civil War". 43% responded that it was better for Greece that the right wing won, 13% responded that it would have been better if the left had won, 20% responded "neither" and 24% did not respond.

List of abbreviations

See also
 Air operations during the Greek Civil War
 Nikos Belogiannis
 Nikos Ploumpidis
 Proxy war
 The Travelling Players

Notes

Bibliography

Surveys
 Bærentzen, Lars, John O. Iatrides, Ole Langwitz Smith, eds. Studies in the history of the Greek Civil War, 1945–1949, 1987
 Byford-Jones, W. The Greek Trilogy: Resistance-Liberation-Revolution, London, 1945
 Carabott, Philip and Thanasis D. Sfikas, The Greek Civil War, (2nd ed 2017)
 Christodoulakis, Nicos. "Country failure and social grievances in the Greek Civil War 1946–1949: An economic approach." Defence and Peace Economics 26.4 (2015): 383–407.
 Close, David H. The Greek Civil War (Routledge, 2014).
 Close, David H. (ed.), The Greek civil war 1943–1950: Studies of Polarization, Routledge, 1993
 Gerolymatos, André. Red Acropolis, Black Terror: The Greek Civil War and the Origins of Soviet-American Rivalry, 1943–1949 (2004).
 Goulter, Christina J. M. "The Greek Civil War: A National Army's Counter-insurgency Triumph," Journal of Military History (July 2014) 78:3 pp: 1017–1055.
 Hondros, John. Occupation and resistance: the Greek agony, 1941–44 (Pella Publishing Company, 1983)
 Iatrides, John O. "Revolution or self-defense? Communist goals, strategy, and tactics in the Greek civil war." Journal of Cold War Studies (2005) 7#3 pp: 3–33.
 Iatrides, John O., and Nicholas X. Rizopoulos. "The international dimension of the Greek Civil War." World Policy Journal 17.1 (2000): 87–103. online
 Iatrides, John O. "George F. Kennan and the birth of containment: the Greek test case." World Policy Journal 22.3 (2005): 126–145. online
 Jones, Howard.  'A New Kind of War' America's Global Strategy and the Truman Doctrine in Greece (1989)
 Kalyvas, S.N. The Logic of Violence in Civil War, Cambridge, 2006
 Karpozilos, Kostis. "The defeated of the Greek Civil War: From fighters to political refugees in the Cold War." Journal of Cold War Studies 16.3 (2014): 62–87. online
 Koumas, Manolis. "Cold War Dilemmas, Superpower Influence, and Regional Interests: Greece and the Palestinian Question, 1947–1949." Journal of Cold War Studies 19.1 (2017): 99–124.
 Kousoulas, D. G. Revolution and Defeat: The Story of the Greek Communist Party, London, 1965
 Marantzidis, Nikos. "The Greek Civil War (1944–1949) and the International Communist System." Journal of Cold War Studies 15.4 (2013): 25–54.
 Mazower. M.  (ed.) After the War was Over. Reconstructing the Family, Nation and State in Greece, 1943–1960 Princeton University Press, 2000
 Nachmani, Amikam. "Civil War and Foreign Intervention in Greece: 1946–49" Journal of Contemporary History (1990) 25#4 pp. 489–522 online
 Nachmani, Amikam.  International intervention in the Greek Civil War, 1990
 Plakoudas, Spyridon. The Greek Civil War: Strategy, Counterinsurgency and the Monarchy (2017)
 Sarafis, Marion (editor), Greece – from resistance to civil war, (Bertrand Russell House Leicester 1980)
 Sarafis, Marion, & Martin Eve (editors), Background to contemporary Greece, (vols 1 & 2, Merlin Press London 1990)
 Sarafis, Stefanos. ELAS: Greek Resistance Army, Merlin Press London 1980 (Greek original 1946 & 1964)
 Sfikas, Thanasis D. The Greek Civil War: Essays on a Conflict of Exceptionalism and Silences (Routledge, 2017).
 Stavrakis, Peter J. Moscow and Greek Communism, 1944–1949 (Cornell University Press, 1989) excerpt.
 Tsoutsoumpis, Spyros. "The Will to Fight: Combat, Morale, and the Experience of National Army Soldiers during the Greek Civil War, 1946–1949." International Journal of Military History and Historiography 1.aop (2022): 1-33.
 Vlavianos. Haris. Greece, 1941–49: From Resistance to Civil War: The Strategy of the Greek Communist Party (1992)

British role

 Alexander, G.M. The Prelude to the Truman Doctrine: British Policy in Greece 1944–1947 (1982)
 Chandler, Geoffrey. The divided land: an Anglo-Greek tragedy, (Michael Russell Norwich, 1994)
 Churchill, Winston S. The Second World War
 Clive, Nigel. A Greek Experience: 1943–1948 (Michael Russell, 1985.)
 Frazier, Robert. Anglo-American relations with Greece: the coming of the Cold War 1942–47 (1991)
 Goulter-Zervoudakis, Christina. "The politicization of intelligence: The British experience in Greece, 1941–1944." Intelligence and National Security (1998) 13#1 pp: 165–194.
 Iatrides, John O., and Nicholas X. Rizopoulos. "The International Dimension of the Greek Civil War." World Policy Journal (2000): 87–103. in JSTOR
 Myers, E.C.F. Greek entanglement (Sutton Publishing, Limited, 1985)
 Richter, Heinz. British Intervention in Greece. From Varkiza to Civil War, London, 1985
 Sfikas, Athanasios D. British Labour Government and The Greek Civil War: 1945–1949 (Edinburgh University Press, 2019).

Historiography
 Lalaki, Despina. "On the Social Construction of Hellenism Cold War Narratives of Modernity, Development and Democracy for Greece." Journal of Historical Sociology (2012) 25#4 pp: 552–577. online
 Marantzidis, Nikos, and Giorgos Antoniou. "The axis occupation and civil war: Changing trends in Greek historiography, 1941–2002." Journal of Peace Research (2004) 41#2 pp: 223–231. online
 Nachmani, Amikam. "Civil War and Foreign Intervention in Greece: 1946–49." Journal of Contemporary History (1990): 489–522. in JSTOR
 Plakoudas, Spyridon. The Greek Civil War: Strategy, Counterinsurgency and the Monarchy (2017) pp 119–127.
 Stergiou, Andreas. "Greece during the cold war." Southeast European and Black Sea Studies (2008) 8#1 pp: 67–73.
 Van Boeschoten, Riki. "The trauma of war rape: A comparative view on the Bosnian conflict and the Greek civil war." History and Anthropology (2003) 14#1 pp: 41–44.

Primary sources
 Andrews, Kevin. The flight of Ikaros, a journey into Greece, Weidenfeld & Nicolson London 1959 & 1969
 Capell, R. Simiomata: A Greek Note Book 1944–45, London, 1946
 Clive, Nigel. A Greek experience 1943–1948, ed. Michael Russell, Wilton Wilts.: Russell, 1985
 Clogg, Richard. Greece, 1940–1949: Occupation, Resistance, Civil War: a Documentary History, New York, 2003
 Danforth Loring, Boeschoten Riki Van Children of the Greek Civil War: refugees and the politics of memory, Chicago, University of Chicago Press, 2012
 Hammond, N.G.L. Venture into Greece: With the Guerillas, 1943–44, London, 1983 (Like Woodhouse, he was a member of the British Military Mission)
 Matthews, Kenneth. Memories of a mountain war – Greece 1944–1949, Longmans London 1972
 Petropoulos, Elias. Corpses, corpses, corpses
 C. M. Woodhouse, Apple of Discord: A Survey of Recent Greek Politics in their International Setting, London, 1948 (Woodhouse was a member of the British Military Mission to Greece during the war)
 Woodhouse, C. M. The Struggle for Greece, 1941–1949, Oxford University Press, 2018

Greek sources
The following are available only in Greek:
 Ευάγγελος Αβέρωφ, Φωτιά και τσεκούρι. Written by ex-New Democracy leader Evangelos Averoff – initially in French.
 Γενικόν Επιτελείον Στρατού, Διεύθυνσις Ηθικής Αγωγής, Η Μάχη του Έθνους, Ελεύθερη Σκέψις, Athens, 1985. Reprinted edition of the original, published in 1952 by the Hellenic Army General Staff.
 Γιώργος Δ. Γκαγκούλιας, H αθέατη πλευρά του εμφυλίου. Written by an ex-ELAS fighter.
 "Γράμμος Στα βήματα του Δημοκρατικού Στρατού Ελλάδας Ιστορικός – Ταξιδιωτικός οδηγός", "Σύγχρονη Εποχή" 2009
 "Δοκίμιο Ιστορίας του ΚΚΕ", τόμος Ι. History of the Communist Party of Greece, issued by its Central Committee in 1999.
 Φίλιππος Ηλιού, Ο Ελληνικός Εμφύλιος Πόλεμος – η εμπλοκή του ΚΚΕ, (The Greek civil war – the involvement of the KKE, Themelion Athens 2004 )
 Δημήτριος Γ. Καλδής, Αναμνήσεις από τον Β' Παγκοσμιο Πολεμο, (Memories of the Second World War, private publication Athina 2007)
 Αλέξανδος Ζαούσης, Οι δύο όχθες, Athens, 1992
 Αλέξανδος Ζαούσης, Η τραγική αναμέτρηση Athens, 1992
 Α. Καμαρινού, "Ο Εμφύλιος Πόλεμος στην Πελοπόνησσο", Brigadier General of DSE's III Division, 2002
 "ΚΚΕ, Επίσημα Κείμενα", τόμοι 6,7,8,9. The full collection of KKE's official documents of this era.
 Μιχάλης Λυμπεράτος, Στα πρόθυρα του Εμφυλίου πολέμου: Από τα Δεκεμβριανά στις εκλογές του 1946–1949, "Βιβλιόραμα", Athens, 2006
 Νίκος Μαραντζίδης, Γιασασίν Μιλλέτ
 Γιώργος Μαργαρίτης, Ιστορία του Ελληνικού εμφύλιου πολέμου 1946–1949, "Βιβλιόραμα", Athens, 2001
 Σπύρος Μαρκεζίνης, Σύγχρονη πολιτική ιστορία της Ελλάδος, Athens, 1994
 Γεώργιος Μόδης, Αναμνήσεις, Thessaloniki, 2004
 Γιώργου Μπαρτζώκα, "Δημοκρατικός Στρατός Ελλάδας", Secretary of the Communist organization of Athens of KKE in 1945, 1986.
 Μαντώ Νταλιάνη – Καραμπατζάκη, Παιδιά στη δίνη του ελληνικού εμφυλίου πολέμου 1946–1949, σημερινοί ενήλικες, Μουσείο Μπενάκη, 2009, 
 Περιοδικό "Δημοκρατικός Στράτος", Magazine first issued in 1948 and re-published as an album collection in 2007.
 Αθανάσιος Ρουσόπουλος, Διακήρυξης του επί κατοχής πρόεδρου της Εθνικής Αλληλεγγύης (Declaration during the Occupation by the chairman of National Solidarity Athanasios Roussopoulos, Athens, published Athens 11 July 1947)
 Στέφανου Σαράφη, "Ο ΕΛΑΣ",written by the military leader of ELAS, General Sarafi in 1954.
 Δημ. Σέρβου, "Που λες... στον Πειραιά", written by one of DSE fighters.

Other languages
 Anon, Egina: Livre de sang, un requisitoire accablant des combattants de la résistance condamnés à mort, with translations by Paul Eluard, Editions "Grèce Libre" c. 1949
 Comité d'Aide à la Grèce Démocratique, Macronissos: le martyre du peuple grec, (translations by Calliope G. Caldis) Geneva 1950
 Dominique Eude, Les Kapetanios (in French, Greek and English), Artheme Fayard, 1970
 Hagen Fleischer, Im Kreuzschatten der Maechte Griechenland 1941–1944 Okkupation – Resistance – Kollaboration (2 vols., New York: Peter Lang, 1986), 819 pp

External links

 A full referenced history of DSE
 Greek Civil War Archive at marxists.org
 Andartikos – a short history of the Greek Resistance, 1941–5 on libcom.org/history
 Dangerous Citizens Online online version of Neni Panourgiá's Dangerous Citizens: The Greek Left and the Terror of the State 
 Report from globalsecurity.org
 Απολογισμός των 'Δεκεμβριανών' (only in Greek) Εφημερίδα ΤΟ ΒΗΜΑ-Δεκέμβρης 1944:60 χρόνια μετά
 Battle of Grammos-Vitsi The decisive battle which ended the Greek Civil War

 
History of modern Greece
Aftermath of World War II
Anti-communism in Greece
Communism-based civil wars
Communism in Greece
Greece–United Kingdom relations
Revolution-based civil wars
Riots and civil disorder in Greece
Wars involving Greece
Wars involving Albania
Wars involving Bulgaria
Wars involving the United Kingdom
Wars involving the United States
Wars involving Yugoslavia
1940s in Greek politics
1946 in Greece
1947 in Greece
1948 in Greece
1949 in Greece
Communist rebellions
Proxy wars
Greece–Soviet Union relations